"Every Other Way" is a song by American musician BT featuring Jes, released as the second single from BT's sixth studio album, These Hopeful Machines. It's also the first of two collaborations with singer Jes from the album.

After lengthy negotiations with BT, the song was remixed by PureNRG (Solarstone and Giuseppe Ottaviani), with BT & Jes - Every Other Way (PureNRG Extended Remix) being released December, 2017.

Track listing

Music video
A music video was shot for "Every Other Way" and it features both BT and Jes in the music video. The music video was released on the same day that BT's new website was launched.

References

2009 songs
2009 singles
BT (musician) songs
Jes (musician) songs
Black Hole Recordings singles
Trance songs